Bitchfield is a small village in the South Kesteven district of Lincolnshire, England. It consists of two groups of buildings connected by Dark Lane, known as Bitchfield and Lower Bitchfield, collectively called Bitchfield.

The village is part of the civil parish of Bitchfield and Bassingthorpe. It had been a civil parish in its own right until 1931.

Bitchfield is mentioned in the Domesday Book as "Billesfelt". Both Bitchfield and Lower Bitchfield are sometimes described as "shrunken" rather than deserted medieval villages. There are signs that both were more extensive at one time. In Bitchfield there is an earthwork known as Camp Field.

The ecclesiastical parish covers just Bitchfield. It is part of the North Beltisloe Group of parishes in the Deanery of Beltisloe, in the Diocese of Lincoln. The parish church, in Lower Bitchfield, is dedicated to St Mary Magdalene. From 2006 to 2011 the incumbent was Rev Richard Ireson. The church is substantially unaltered, with features of both Norman and Perpendicular architecture.

References

External links

Villages in Lincolnshire
South Kesteven District
Former civil parishes in Lincolnshire